Sascha Reinelt (born 3 April 1973 in Sindelfingen) is a German former field hockey player who competed in the 2000 Summer Olympics and in the 2004 Summer Olympics.

References

External links

1973 births
Living people
German male field hockey players
Olympic field hockey players of Germany
Field hockey players at the 2000 Summer Olympics
Field hockey players at the 2004 Summer Olympics
Olympic bronze medalists for Germany
Olympic medalists in field hockey
Medalists at the 2004 Summer Olympics
1998 Men's Hockey World Cup players
2002 Men's Hockey World Cup players
People from Sindelfingen
Sportspeople from Stuttgart (region)